Dungeonland was a Dungeon Crawler Moba, made by Brazilian developer Critical Studio, using the Unity engine. The game was released on January 29, 2013 for Windows.

Gameplay
Dungeonland was a multiplayer dungeon crawler MOBA, which takes place in a theme park controlled by a 'Dungeon Maestro'. Featuring an isometric camera, the focus of each match is for the 3 players to overcome the obstacles and enemies of the dungeon set by the other player as the Dungeon Maestro. The game features simultaneous local and online multiplayer.

It is also possible for a fourth player to play as the Dungeon Maestro against the other players. They gain cards that can be spent with mana points to create obstacles such as killer rabbits, exploding frogs, or giant fans.

Development
In November 2013, a free-to-play version of the game was released through Valve's Steam platform. The game's publisher Paradox Interactive initially had planned to develop Dungeonland into a franchise.

Dungeonland was shut down by Paradox on April 18, 2018.

Reception

The PC version received "average" reviews according to the review aggregation website Metacritic.

References

External links
 
 

2013 video games
Cooperative video games
Fantasy video games
MacOS games
Multiplayer online battle arena games
Paradox Interactive games
Video games developed in Brazil
Video games set in amusement parks
Windows games